Events in the year 1974 in Japan. It corresponds to Shōwa 49 (昭和49年) in the Japanese calendar.

Incumbents 
Emperor: Hirohito
Prime minister: Kakuei Tanaka (Liberal Democratic) until December 9, Takeo Miki (Liberal Democratic)
Chief Cabinet Secretary: Susumu Nikaido until November 11, Noboru Takeshita until December 9, Ichitaro Ide
Chief Justice of the Supreme Court: Tomokazu Murakami
President of the House of Representatives: Shigesaburō Maeo
President of the House of Councillors: Kenzō Kōno
Diet sessions: 72nd (regular session opened on December 1, 1973, to June 3), 73rd (extraordinary, July 24 to July 31), 74th (extraordinary, December 9 to December 25), 75th (regular, December 27 to July 4, 1975)

Governors
Aichi Prefecture: Mikine Kuwahara 
Akita Prefecture: Yūjirō Obata 
Aomori Prefecture: Shunkichi Takeuchi 
Chiba Prefecture: Taketo Tomonō 
Ehime Prefecture: Haruki Shiraishi 
Fukui Prefecture: Heidayū Nakagawa 
Fukuoka Prefecture: Hikaru Kamei 
Fukushima Prefecture: Morie Kimura
Gifu Prefecture: Saburō Hirano 
Gunma Prefecture: Konroku Kanda 
Hiroshima Prefecture: Hiroshi Miyazawa 
Hokkaido: Naohiro Dōgakinai 
Hyogo Prefecture: Tokitada Sakai
Ibaraki Prefecture: Nirō Iwakami 
Ishikawa Prefecture: Yōichi Nakanishi 
Iwate Prefecture: Tadashi Chida 
Kagawa Prefecture: Masanori Kaneko (until 4 September); Tadao Maekawa (starting 5 September)
Kagoshima Prefecture: Saburō Kanemaru 
Kanagawa Prefecture: Bunwa Tsuda 
Kochi Prefecture: Masumi Mizobuchi (until 6 December); Chikara Nakauchi (starting 7 December)
Kumamoto Prefecture: Issei Sawada 
Kyoto Prefecture: Torazō Ninagawa 
Mie Prefecture: Ryōzō Tagawa 
Miyagi Prefecture: Sōichirō Yamamoto 
Miyazaki Prefecture: Hiroshi Kuroki 
Nagano Prefecture: Gon'ichirō Nishizawa 
Nagasaki Prefecture: Kan'ichi Kubo 
Nara Prefecture: Ryozo Okuda 
Niigata Prefecture: Shiro Watari (until 30 April); Takeo Kimi (starting 1 May) 
Oita Prefecture: Masaru Taki 
Okayama Prefecture: Shiro Nagano 
Okinawa Prefecture: Chōbyō Yara 
Osaka Prefecture: Ryōichi Kuroda 
Saga Prefecture: Sunao Ikeda 
Saitama Prefecture: Yawara Hata 
Shiga Prefecture: Kinichiro Nozaki (until 6 December); Masayoshi Takemura (starting 7 December)
Shiname Prefecture: Seiji Tsunematsu 
Shizuoka Prefecture: Yūtarō Takeyama (until 24 June); Keizaburō Yamamoto (starting 10 July)
Tochigi Prefecture: Nobuo Yokokawa (until 7 December); Yuzuru Funada (starting 8 December)
Tokushima Prefecture: Yasunobu Takeichi 
Tokyo: Ryōkichi Minobe 
Tottori Prefecture: Jirō Ishiba (until 22 February); Kōzō Hirabayashi (starting 27 March)
Toyama Prefecture: Kokichi Nakada 
Wakayama Prefecture: Masao Ohashi 
Yamagata Prefecture: Seiichirō Itagaki 
Yamaguchi Prefecture: Masayuki Hashimoto 
Yamanashi Prefecture: Kunio Tanabe

Events 
May 9 - A magnitude 6.9 earthquake strikes the Izu Peninsula, killing 30 and injuring 102.
May 27 – Keyence was founded.
June 20 – Daito Industry, as predecessor of Daito Trust Construction founded in Chikusa-ku, Nagoya.
August 30 - A powerful bomb blast in Marunouchi business area, Tokyo, according to official confirmed resulting, 8 person fatalities, 376 were injures.
November 9 - A LPG carrier, Juyo Maru 10 collision with Liberian cargo ship Pacific Ares, following caught fire in Tokyo Bay, according to Marine Safety Agency of Japan confirmed official, 33 persons lost to lives.
December 18 – According to Japanese government official confirmed report, A petroleum tank broken in Mizushima refinery, Kurashiki, Okayama Prefecture, in affective 80,000 litter crude oil spill and contamination tide was widely Seto Inland Sea area, these place recoveries spend for more two years.

Births 
January 5 - Yutaka Yoshie, professional wrestler
January 29 – Taketo Aoki, baseball player
February 7 - 
Jun Seba, aka Nujabes, hip-hop producer
Yō Yoshida, actress 
February 27 - Hiroyasu Shimizu, speed skater
March 12 – Hekiru Shiina, voice actress and singer  
March 28 - Daisuke Kishio, voice actor
June 13 - Takahiro Sakurai, voice actor
June 17 - Mikiyo Ōno, model, actress and J-pop singer
July 2 -Kiyohiko Shibukawa, fashion model and actor  
August 4 – Wasabi Mizuta, voice actress
September 29 – Hirofmi Ono, businessman (a CEO of live storming entertainment)
October 8 - Koji Murofushi, hammer thrower
November 8 - Masashi Kishimoto, manga author
December 4 - Tadahito Iguchi, baseball player
December 27 - Fumiko Orikasa, voice actress and singer

Deaths 
March 1 – Kōtarō Tanaka, jurist and law professor (b. 1890)
April 12 – Kimiko Tsumura, Noh traditional performer (b. 1902)
August 11 – Fusako Kitashirakawa, seventh daughter of Emperor Meiji (b. 1890)
December 24 – Sentarō Ōmori, admiral (b. 1892)

See also
 1974 in Japanese television
 List of Japanese films of 1974

References

 
Japan
Years of the 20th century in Japan